Oliver "Oli" Sail is a New Zealand professional footballer who currently plays for Wellington Phoenix as a goalkeeper. He also has been selected for the New Zealand national football team.

Club career

Wanderers SC
Sail started his career playing for Wanderers SC, a special club set up to develop players for the New Zealand national under-20 football team.

Auckland City
In 2013, Sail joined Auckland City but wouldn't debut until the following year in the semi-final of the 2013–14 ASB Premiership, when he replaced Tamati Williams in Auckland City's 4–1 victory over its classic rival Waitakere United.

Wellington Phoenix
Sail joined Wellington Phoenix to be part of their new reserves team playing in the ASB Premiership.

On 3 March 2017, Sail signed his first senior contract, penning a two-year deal with Wellington Phoenix.

On 25 March 2018, Sail made his A-League debut against Brisbane Roar in a 2–2 draw.

Sail had a wait of 663 days between games before he saw another start for the Phoenix after not playing at all during the 2019-2020 season, getting the start in a 2–2 draw against Western Sydney Wanderers. He then went on to record successive clean sheets against the Newcastle Jets and Perth Glory as well as man of the match honours, helping a resurgent Phoenix claim back-to-back victories for the first time in a year.

Perth Glory
On 3 March 2023, Sail confirmed that he would be leaving the Wellington Phoenix at the end of the 2022-23 A-League season, to join Perth Glory from the following season.

International career

U-20
Though Sail was picked for the New Zealand U-17 team in 2013, he didn't get on the pitch. He was then picked for the New Zealand U-20 team for the 2015 FIFA U-20 World Cup played in New Zealand, making his debut in the 0–0 draw against Ukraine. He then started again in the 4–0 loss to the United States three days later.

Senior
In 2014, Sail was called up to New Zealand's senior squad for two friendlies against China and Thailand, but he was unused in both matches.

References

External links
 
 Oliver Sail profile on Wellington Phoenix website.
 

1996 births
Living people
Auckland City FC players
Wellington Phoenix FC players
Association football goalkeepers
New Zealand association footballers
New Zealand international footballers
Association footballers from Auckland